Nothing Sacred is an American drama series that aired from 1997 to 1998 on ABC. The series was created by a Jesuit priest named Bill Cain and producer David Manson. 

The series centered on the daily goings-on at a parish in an inner-city neighborhood. The show drew criticism from some Catholic organizations for its frank treatment of sensitive issues such as AIDS, racism, and abortion, as well as its portrayal of church issues in the post-Second Vatican Council era, which some saw as favoring those with more liberal views of the Council. The show and its sponsors were targeted for boycotts by the Catholic League. The series faced low ratings and ABC canceled its order for the final four episodes, eventually canceling the series entirely after the March 14, 1998 episode (with five completed episodes left unaired).

The series did win critical acclaim, including a Peabody Award for its "honest portrayal of the complexity of faith in the modern era" and a Humanitas Prize. It also received nominations for Emmy Awards and a Golden Globe Award nomination for actor Kevin Anderson.

Premise
Father Francis Xavier "Ray" Reyneaux is the head priest of St. Thomas Catholic Church, which is located in a low-income neighborhood of an unnamed city. Father Ray deals with his own personal crises of faith in addition to the challenges of serving the needs of his community. Besides Father Ray, the series also follows the predicaments of the parish staff, which includes feminist nun Sister Maureen "Mo" Brody, the inexperienced Father Eric, and church secretary Rachel. 

The series included plot lines ranging from "the homeless and local opposition to their presence, the church’s soup kitchen, [Sister Mo's] insistence that God be addressed as both Mother and Father, Ray’s temptation to rekindle a romance with an old flame, the desire of his assistant priest to escape the turmoil of the city to a quiet monastery, the dissatisfaction of a pregnant parishioner at Ray’s refusal to answer her directly about abortion, and a broken father-son relationship."

Cast 
 Kevin Anderson as Father Francis Xavier "Ray" Reyneaux
 Bruce Altman as Sidney Walters
 Scott Michael Campbell as Father Eric
 Ann Dowd as Sister Maureen "Mo" Brody
 Tamara Mello as Rachel
 Brad Sullivan as Father Leo
 José Zúñiga as Juan Alberto "J.A." Ortiz
 Jennifer Beals as Justine Madsen Judd

Episodes

Production
The show was created by David Manson and Bill Cain. Manson had befriended Cain, a Jesuit priest and playwright, and wrote the pilot episode with him. Cain chose to be credited under the pseudonym "Paul Leland" in order to “create some separation" and avoid the perception that he was "writing as an official voice of the church.” Cain said that intention for the show was to "depict genuine people struggling to be faithful to the church, something that is no more easy to do than to raise a family." Michael Breault, a Jesuit brother, also served as a consultant for the series.

The pilot episode was filmed in Toronto. The rest of the series was filmed in Los Angeles, where the Anglican Lutheran Church in the Pico-Union district was used for exterior shots of the fictional St. Thomas Church. The sanctuary of Angelica was also used to represent the sanctuary of a fellow clergyman in one of the episodes.

Release 
Nothing Sacred premiered on September 18, 1997 at 8:00pm/7c on ABC.

Broadcast history
 Thursdays 8:00 p.m. (September 18, 1997 – December 18, 1997)
 Saturdays 8:00 p.m. (January 17, 1998 – March 14, 1998)

Controversy
In 1997, the Catholic League, and board of advisory member Alan Keyes, specifically, declared the show a "sacrilege" according to one commentator, who also quoted Keyes as calling it "propaganda dressed up as entertainment, [infused with] the belief that there are no moral absolutes." Among the sponsors who withdrew ads from the show in response to the boycotts were Red Lobster, Ocean Spray, Chrysler-Plymouth, and American Honda Motors. 

Other Catholic organizations and figures defended the show, with one cardinal citing how the program depicts the "human struggles that people bring to their parishes.” The Tidings, the newspaper of the Archdiocese of Los Angeles, published an editorial in support of the series. A group of more than 100 priests, nuns, and bishops also took out an advertisement in a November 1997 issue of the magazine Advertising Age, criticizing the Catholic League's boycott stance and urging advertisers to support the show. 

Despite the backlash and the show's low viewership, ABC announced plans in November to order more episodes because of the show's quality and critical acclaim. However, the episode "HIV Priest", which was originally supposed to air as the second episode, was not broadcast and ultimately went unaired. The episode concerned a storyline about a priest who contracted AIDS.

Cancelation 
The series was initially aired in a competitive time slot, going up against popular sitcom Friends on Thursday nights. In the series' second week, it ranked 92nd out of 114 network shows. ABC preempted the series for the network's November sweeps period and later moved the show to a Saturday night airtime. 

The series was officially canceled after the March 14, 1998 episode, leaving five completed episodes unaired. Four of these unaired episodes were screened at a two-night event at a New York fundraiser in May 1999.

Reception 
Nothing Sacred received praise for its writing, acting, and examination of modern faith. On review aggregate site Rotten Tomatoes, Nothing Sacred has an approval rating of 71% based on 21 critics' reviews. The site's consensus reads, "Nothing Sacred is an inquisitive study of religion in the modern world, with an appealing Kevin Anderson providing solid eloquence even when the series feels too self-satisfied in its sermon."

David Wild of Rolling Stone called it "the best new show" of the fall and said "it's enough to give you faith in ABC." Ken Tucker of Entertainment Weekly gave the series a grade of A-, writing "True to its title, Sacred holds neither political nor religious correctness as sacrosanct. It makes Roman Catholic policy clear, then shows how policy can play out in messy lives." Caryn James of The New York Times also praised the show, stating "it is set above [other new shows] by the thoughtfulness of its writing, its ambiguity, its refusal to preach. Though the series offers a complex study of faith in the real world, its great strength is that it works as engaging human drama, apart from religious concerns." 

Ray Richmond of Variety was less positive, criticizing the show for its lack of realism and writing, "Smart though often flippant, 'Nothing Sacred' is gutsy but a bit too enamored of its envelope-pushing sense of rebellion." Walter Kirn of Slate called the show "smug" and "just more phony Hollywood iconoclasm."

In a retrospective review in 2020, Catholic magazine America opined, "Here was a profoundly Catholic show that laid bare the fault lines of the church while capturing the beauty of belief. It should have been celebrated."

Awards and nominations

References

External links
 

1990s American drama television series
1997 American television series debuts
1998 American television series endings
American Broadcasting Company original programming
Television series by 20th Century Fox Television
Peabody Award-winning television programs
Television shows set in New York City
Catholic drama television series
Religious controversies in television
Religious controversies in the United States
Catholicism in fiction
Television controversies in the United States